The 1968 BC Lions finished in fourth place in the Western Conference with a 4–11–1 record and continued to have an inept offense.

The Lions scored just 16 touchdowns all season. Finding the long-term replacement for Joe Kapp was difficult, and at one point, assistant coach Jackie Parker, a CFL legend who had retired in 1965, donned the pads for eight games at quarterback. Eventually, former Dallas Cowboys draft pick Paul Brothers won the starting quarterback job and would be the Lions pivot for the next three seasons.

The main brightspot was the Lions transitioning to a kicking specialist as their placekicker, Ted Gerela, accounted for 115 of the team's 217 points and hit 30 fieldgoals (at the time it was not only a CFL record, but a professional record). Another brightspot was rookie fullback Jim Evensen who rushed for 1220 yards and had 4 TDs.

The Lions played their first ever July regular season game as the league slowly transitioned as way from two games a week which were common place in the 1950s and early 1960s.

Regular season

Season standings

Season schedule

Offensive leaders

Awards and records

1968 CFL All-Stars
None

References

BC Lions seasons
1968 Canadian Football League season by team
1968 in British Columbia